Calceochiton is an extinct genus of polyplacophoran molluscs. Calceochiton became extinct during the Ordovician period.

References 

Ordovician molluscs
Prehistoric chiton genera